This List of cable-stayed bridges in the United States includes notable cable-stayed bridges, both existing and destroyed, in the United States of America, organized by name.

A 

 Abraham Lincoln Bridge
 Arthur J. DiTommaso Memorial Bridge
 Arthur Ravenel Jr. Bridge

B 

 Barton Creek Bridge
 Bayview Bridge
 Benton City – Kiona Bridge
 Bill Emerson Memorial Bridge
 Bluff Dale Suspension Bridge
 Bob Kerrey Pedestrian Bridge

C 

 Cable Bridge
 Christopher S. Bond Bridge (Kansas City, Missouri)
 Clark Bridge
 Cochrane–Africatown USA Bridge

D 

 Dames Point Bridge
 Davenport Skybridge
 Denver Millennium Bridge
 Don Burnett Bicycle-Pedestrian Bridge

E 

 East 21st Street Bridge
 East Huntington Bridge

F 

 Fred Hartman Bridge

G 

 Goethals Bridge
 Gordie Howe International Bridge
 Great River Bridge
 Greenville Bridge

H 

 Hale Boggs Memorial Bridge
 Harbor Drive Pedestrian Bridge
 William H. Harsha Bridge

I 

 Indian River Inlet Bridge
 Ironton–Russell Bridge

J 

 Jesús Izcoa Moure Bridge
 John James Audubon Bridge (Mississippi River)
 John O'Connell Bridge

K 

 Kosciuszko Bridge

L 

 Lane Avenue Bridge
 Leonard P. Zakim Bunker Hill Memorial Bridge
 Lewis and Clark Bridge (Ohio River)
 Long Beach International Gateway

M 

 Margaret Hunt Hill Bridge
 Margaret McDermott Bridge
 Martin Olav Sabo Bridge

N 

 William H. Natcher Bridge
 Niagara Clifton Bridge
 North Avenue Bridge

P 

 Penobscot Narrows Bridge and Observatory
 Platte River Bridge
 Pomeroy–Mason Bridge

R 

 Rainbow Bridge (Texas)
 Reiman Bridge
 Senator William V. Roth Jr. Bridge

S 

 Sidney Lanier Bridge
 Stan Musial Veterans Memorial Bridge
 Sundial Bridge at Turtle Bay
 Sunshine Skyway Bridge

T 

 Talmadge Memorial Bridge
 Tappan Zee Bridge (2017–present)
 Tilikum Crossing

U 

 U.S. Grant Bridge

V 

 Varina-Enon Bridge
 Veterans Memorial Bridge (Steubenville, Ohio)
 Veterans' Glass City Skyway

References 

Bridges in the United States by type
USA
Cable-stayed